The Yanqu Dam is a concrete-face rock-fill dam on the Yellow River in Xinghai County, Qinghai Province, China. Construction on the dam began in 2010 and its 1,200 MW hydroelectric power station became operational in 2016. It is located upstream of the Longyangxia Dam.

See also

 List of tallest dams in the world
 List of dams and reservoirs in China
 List of tallest dams in China

References

Dams in China
Dams on the Yellow River
Concrete-face rock-fill dams
Hydroelectric power stations in Qinghai
Energy infrastructure completed in 2016